Palmarolle is a municipality in northwestern Quebec, Canada, in the Abitibi-Ouest Regional County Municipality. It covers 118.36 km2 and had a population of 1,465 as of the Canada 2011 Census. It is considered to have the best agricultural land of the entire Abitibi region.

History
The area began to be colonized in 1911 when the township was surveyed. The completion of the National Transcontinental Railway at La Sarre and Macamic led to further waves of development with the arrival of new settlers in 1916, 1918, and 1929. Following the pattern of other places in the Abitibi, the settlement was named after a historic military figure, François-Charles Bertrand de Palmarole or Palmarolle (1714 ‑ 1760), lieutenant of the La Sarre Regiment and Knight of the Order of Saint Louis. In 1921, the parish was formed and in 1930, the place was incorporated as a municipality.

Demographics
Population trend:
 Population in 2011: 1465 (2006 to 2011 population change: 0.8%)
 Population in 2006: 1453
 Population in 2001: 1527
 Population in 1996: 1561
 Population in 1991: 1571

Private dwellings occupied by usual residents: 569 (total dwellings: 642)

Mother tongue:
 English as first language: 0%
 French as first language: 100%
 English and French as first language: 0%
 Other as first language: 0%

Municipal council
 Mayor: Marcel Caron
 Councillors: Carolle Hamel, Louisa Gobeil, Ghislain Godbout, Sylvie Hénault-Marcil, Gino Cameron, Jean-Marie Depont

Notable natives of Palmarolle 
 Henri Tousignant (born August 20, 1937), a Liberal party member of the Canadian House of Commons
 Rogatien Vachon (born September 8, 1945), a professional ice hockey goaltender who played in the National Hockey League and is a member of the Hockey Hall of Fame.

References

Municipalities in Quebec
Incorporated places in Abitibi-Témiscamingue
Populated places established in 1911